The list of sport facilities  in Istanbul lists the relevant architectural entities within the city limits of Istanbul.

Football

 Bahçelievler Stadium
 Başakşehir Fatih Terim Stadium
 Güngören M.Yahya Baş Stadyumu
 Recep Tayyip Erdoğan Stadium
 Şükrü Saracoğlu Stadium
 Türk Telekom Arena
 Vodafone Park
 Ali Sami Yen Stadium (demolished)
 BJK İnönü Stadium (demolished)
 Taksim Stadium (demolished)

Basketball-Volleyball (indoors)
 Abdi İpekçi Arena (demolished)
 Ahmet Cömert Sport Hall
 Ayhan Sahenk Sport Hall
 Beykoz Sport Hall
 BJK Akatlar Arena
 Burhan Felek Sport Hall
 Caferağa Sport Hall
 Cebeci Sport Hall
 Haldun Alagas Sport Hall
 Hamdi Akın Sports Hall
 Sinan Erdem Dome
 Ülker Sports Arena
 Lütfi Kırdar ICEC (formerly used as a sports hall)

Olympic and Athletic Complexes
 Atatürk Olympic Stadium
 Ataköy Athletics Arena

Racing Circuits
 Istanbul Park - Formula One Grand Prix Circuit

Table

Other venues

Football
Alibeyköy SK
Kartal S.K.
Bayrampaşaspor 
Dostluk Spor Kulübü 
Fatih Karagümrük SK
Feriköy SK
Gaziosmanpaşaspor
Küçükçekmece SK
Küçükköyspor
Maltepe Yalıspor
Rumblers FC
Taksim SK
Tepecik B.S.
Yenibosna Sports Club
Zeytinburnuspor
Alibeyköyspor
Anadolu Üsküdar 1908
Ataşehir Belediyespor
Bakırköyspor
Beykoz 1908 
Beylerbeyi S.K.
Eyüpspor
Güngören Belediyespor
Istanbul Büyükşehir Belediyespor
Istanbul Maltepespor
Kartalspor
Marmara Üniversitesi Spor
Pendikspor
Sarıyer G.K.
Vefa S.K.

Ice Hockey
Istanbul Paten Kulübü

Related lists
List of museums and monuments in Istanbul
List of urban centers in Istanbul
List of universities in Istanbul
List of schools in Istanbul
List of architectural structures in Istanbul
List of columns and towers in Istanbul
List of libraries in Istanbul
List of mayors of Istanbul
List of Istanbulites

Istanbul
Sport in Istanbul
Istanbul-related lists
Istanbul
Sport